Phaneesh Murthy (Kannada: ಫಣೀಶ್ ಮೂರ್ತಿ) is an Indian technology businessman. He was made director of Infosys Ltd in 2000, before being fired from the company in 2002. Subsequently, he became the Chief Executive Officer of iGATE Corporation in 2003, after the company acquired his start-up Quintant. Murthy later became President in 2006 and was re-elected in 2010. The board of iGate sacked its President and CEO Murthy in May 2013, following an investigation into a relationship that he had with a subordinate employee and a claim of sexual harassment.

Early life
Phaneesh Murthy was born in a middle class family in Bangalore, Karnataka. He received his B.Tech Degree in Mechanical Engineering from the Indian Institute of Technology, Madras and PGDMgt from Indian Institute of Management, Ahmedabad.

Career

Early Career - (Pre-2003)
After graduating in 1987, Murthy started working for Sonata Software, where his strategies were responsible for the Company to reach Break even point. After having successfully worked with Sonata for 5 years he moved to Infosys Ltd. His career progressed within Infosys, and he served as Worldwide Head of Sales and Marketing, Communications, and the Product Solutions Group of Infosys Ltd. from 1995 to 2002. He served as a Director of Infosys (since May 2000) and as a Director of Infosys BPO Ltd.  As the Global Sales Head of Infosys, he has been widely credited as the one who was responsible for taking the organization from just $2 million in revenues to $700 million in under 10 years. He was fired from Infosys in 2002 after the company settled a case of sexual harassment, reportedly for $3 million.

In January 2003, Murthy founded and was a Consultant for Quintant Services Limited, a Business Services Provisioning company with a global services delivery model. He was co-founder of Primentor from July 2002 to August 2003.

Career At iGate - (2003-2015)

Murthy joined iGATE Global Solutions Limited in August 2003 after the company acquired Quintant in late 2003. After joining iGATE, he played a key role in restructuring iGATE.  He has been instrumental in positioning the services companies under the iGATE Global umbrella, thereby resulting in synergies between the various service offerings of iGATE Global Solutions Ltd. He has been the Chief Executive Officer and President of iGATE since 1 April 2008, and serves as the Managing Director of iGate Global Solutions Ltd. and iGATE Corporation. Phaneesh has transformed iGATE from a loss making, negative margins, to a growth company with profitability through Business Outcomes that is increasingly being adopted by Global customers.

Murthy is credited with the iGATE acquisition of Patni Computer Systems in 2011 in hope that the combined entity can become a tier-1 organization. At the time of the acquisition, iGATE was a mid-sized company and Patni Computer Systems was more than double its size. The deal made iGATE one of the largest IT companies in India.

On 21 May 2013 iGATE Corporation said that its President and CEO Phaneesh Murthy has been fired following a probe into Murthy's relationship with a female subordinate employee and sexual harassment claim.

Philanthropy
iGATE has held golf tournaments at TPC Sawgrass which offer $100,000 in prizes to go toward charities. Murthy and his teammate Chip Perry took the top prize of $20,000. Murthy donated his $10,000 to Tiger Preservation.

Sexual harassment allegations and lawsuits
Murthy had to face a sexual harassment lawsuit while being with Infosys, which had been filed by his former executive secretary Reka Maximovitch. Maximovitch, a Bulgarian American national, had filed the lawsuit, complaining of sexual harassment. At the same time another woman, Jennifer Griffith, had filed similar charges resulting in a US$800,000 settlement. His then employer, Infosys, settled the lawsuit out of court for $3 million & fired him in 2002. He strongly denied the accusations throughout proceedings.

In 2013, another claim of sexual harassment was labeled against Murthy by a subordinate employee Araceli Roiz. Following an investigation by outside legal counsel, engaged by the board of iGate, Murthy was sacked from the position of President & CEO by the company. iGate officially stated that "the investigation showed that Murthy had violated iGate's policy by failing to report his relationship with the employee, although he did not violate iGate's harassment policy". However, Murthy had denied all the charges.

References 

Indian Institute of Management Ahmedabad alumni
IIT Madras alumni
Living people
Year of birth missing (living people)